Rick Davies (born Evan Rick Davies, 8 April 1952) is a former Australian rules footballer who played with Sturt and South Adelaide in the South Australian National Football League (SANFL) and  in the Victorian Football League (VFL). Nicknamed the "Jumbo Prince", Davies played a total of 390 games throughout his career (317 for Sturt, 33 for South Adelaide, 20 for Hawthorn, and 20 State Games for South Australia. Though not tall for a ruckman at only 188 cm (6'2"), Davies was known for his strong marking and body strength which he used to great effect against opponents who were often taller and heavier than him.

Playing career
Rick Davies' senior career began with Sturt in 1970 at age 18. He went on to be named as Sturt’s best and fairest player in a record seven of the eight seasons he played for the Double Blues. One of Davies' most noteworthy performances was his dominant display in the 1976 Grand Final victory against Port Adelaide. Davies was judged best on ground on the day when the all-time SANFL record attendance was set when 66,897 fans crammed into Football Park.

In 1981 Davies joined Hawthorn in the VFL. Changes to rules for rucking contests disadvantaged shorter ruckman, and Davies mostly played in the forward pocket, kicking 37 goals. He returned to Sturt in 1982 and was their leading goal kicker for the next three seasons.

In 1983 Davies kicked an SANFL record 151 goals for the season (later beaten in 1990 by Scott Hodges of Port Adelaide who kicked 153), which included 11 goals in a 114-point win over Port Adelaide at the Unley Oval, and a club record 15 against West Adelaide in round eight at Football Park (this would be only one goal shy of Football Park’s all-time record of 16 goals in a match by Woodville’s John Roberts in 1976). Davies would play his last Grand Final for Sturt later in the 1983 season when the Double Blues went down to West Adelaide. After averaging over 6 goals per game in 1983, Davies was restricted by Tony Burgess to only two in the Grand Final, with his first in the 3rd quarter making him the first player to ever kick 150 goals in a SANFL season, beating Tim Evans’ record of 146 from 1980.

Rick Davies’ form at full forward for Sturt in 1983 was such that he kept Sturt's young goal kicking hotshot Ian Wilmott playing in the reserves for most of the season. Wilmott, who kicked 97 goals for the season in the SANFL Reserves (plus another two in a disappointing finals series), played only one game of league football in 1983 in Round 10 against Norwood at the Norwood Oval, kicking six goals in his league debut (while Davies was on state duty with the South Australian team in Perth). The next week Davies returned to the side while Wilmott was back in the reserves team.

After again leading Sturt’s goal kicking in 1984, Davies moved to South Adelaide in 1985, and became playing coach later that season when former Hawthorn teammate Don Scott was sacked. The Panthers finished eighth in 1985 and ninth in 1986, with Davies leading goalkicker with 72 goals in each season from full forward. He retired as a player at the end of the 1986 season, with a SANFL total of 350 league appearances and 781 goals over 16 seasons.

Representative career
Rick Davies was a regular interstate representative, with 20 appearances for South Australia from 1973 until 1983, captaining the State in 1979 and 1980. In 1980 Davies was named as captain of the All Australian team.

Coaching career
Rick Davies stayed on as non-playing coach of South Adelaide in 1987. The Panthers finished last and Davies was replaced as coach. In September 1988 he was named as coach of Sturt after Mervyn Keane's controversial departure. Sturt had finished fifth under Keane in 1988 but finished last in 1989 under Davies, who resigned following Sturt's 132-point loss to Glenelg in their last match. The Double Blues continued to struggle after Davies resigned, not recovering until after eight consecutive wooden spoons and a winless 1995 season.

Awards and achievements
Rick Davies was awarded Life Membership as a player of the Sturt Football Club in 1977. His 781 SANFL goals ranks 5th on the all-time list and his 151 goals in 1983 broke the record of 146 set in 1980 by Port Adelaide's Tim Evans, before being bettered by Port's Scott Hodges who kicked 153 in 1990. He was one of 113 inaugural inductees into the South Australian Football Hall of Fame in 2002 and his 350 SANFL games for Sturt and South Adelaide qualified him for SANFL Player Life Membership. 
Davies was named in Sturt's "Team of the Century" as 1st Ruck and forward.

In 2013 Davies was inducted into the Australian Football Hall of Fame at a gala dinner in Canberra.

In 2014, a bar in the new southern stand at the re-developed Adelaide Oval was named in his honour.

References

External links

1952 births
Living people
Australian rules footballers from South Australia
South Australian State of Origin players
Hawthorn Football Club players
South Adelaide Football Club players
Sturt Football Club players
Sturt Football Club coaches
South Adelaide Football Club coaches
All-Australians (1953–1988)
People educated at Prince Alfred College
Australian Football Hall of Fame inductees
South Australian Football Hall of Fame inductees